Speedy Eggbert, originally Speedy Blupi, is a video game for Windows based PCs developed by EPSITEC, and released on September 13, 1998 as an independent title. It is part of the Blupi series, and the successor to Planet Blupi.

A sequel, Speedy Blupi II, was also released, and renamed by eGames to Speedy Eggbert 2. Speedy Blupi has been released as freeware by EPSITEC, and is available at blupi.org, Planet Blupi was released Open-source under GPLv3 on GitHub in 2017.

Gameplay
The whole game is centered on a central hub, in which the player character Blupi (alias Eggbert) can access all of the game's seven themed worlds. At first, he can only go to the practice level, where he will learn most of the controls listed above. The rest of the controls are not shown to during the practice game; they are left for the player to discover these moves while passing through the levels.

The game has over forty levels, ranging from easy to relatively difficult. The objective of each level is to collect all the treasure chests and then move to the endpoint. The game includes enemies which Blupi cannot destroy normally, but can be destroyed using the Helicopter, the Glue Tank and self-placed yellow mines.

The Jeep and Skateboard allow Blupi to destroy all kinds of mines them without losing a life. Glue balls can be collected by Blupi, where they can be fired as weapons from the Glue Tank or Helicopter to defeat enemies. There are also deductive problems to be solved and errors may make finishing the level impossible (by for example, accidentally destroying all helicopters available).

Level editor
Players can create up to 20 custom missions on their account, for a total of 160 custom missions across all players. They can use all the objects, enemies, and vehicles to make their levels. However, they cannot make the large keys and doors on single player mode. The custom missions in game can be saved to the C:/User directory as .XCH files, which can later be loaded to import older missions.

Development 
Speedy Blupi was later published by eGames and rereleased as Speedy Eggbert. The game was featured in the CD-ROM game package Arcade Classics, which featured other eGames titles, such as DemonStar and Crazy Drake.

Sequel
Among the changes noticeable in the sequel, Speedy Eggbert 2, are the addition of keys and lock barriers, teleporters, special barriers that only open when a specified number of treasure boxes have been collected, new enemies for Eggbert to defeat, and the addition of new themes, such as slime, cavern, cheese, and palace. A new vehicle, the hovercraft, is introduced in Speedy Eggbert 2. The player is also still allowed to create his/her own levels.

Eggbert also appears as a robot in the "Taxi 1" game in the computer game Wild Wheels, consisting of various missions and races, all to be accomplished by a remote-controlled car. There, he is one of three robots to be taken to their work stations in as short a time as possible and with as little damage as possible to the taxi. In another,a number of Eggberts, undergoing torture, have to be rescued before their execution.

References

1998 video games
EGames (video game developer) games
Multiplayer and single-player video games
Platform games
Video games developed in Switzerland
Windows games
Windows-only games